The Falls is a rural locality in the Southern Downs Region, Queensland, Australia. In the  The Falls had a population of 70 people.

It borders New South Wales.

History 
The location presumably takes its name from the Queen Mary Falls on Spring Creek within the locality.

Ferndale Provisional School opened on 9 November 1948. In 1953 it became The Falls State School in 1953. The school closed on 26 August 1974. The school was located at 902 Spring Creek Road.

In the  The Falls had a population of 70 people.

Attractions
There are a number of attractions in the locality:

 Queen Mary Falls Lookout in the Main Range National Park, opposite 676 Spring Creek Road
 Carrs Lookout, 1503 Spring Creek Road
Moss Gardens, Spring Creek Road about  after Carrs Lookout

References 

Southern Downs Region
Localities in Queensland